is a collegiate baseball league located in central Kansai region of Japan, stretching from Hyōgo in the west to Kyoto in the east. The league joined the All Japan University Baseball Federation in 1951.

Members

National Championships

Champion
1956 - Kansai
1972 - Kansai
1988 - Kinki
1989 - Kinki
1997 - Kinki
1998 - Kinki

Runner-up
1952 - Kwansei Gakuin
1952 - Ritsumeikan
1959 - Kwansei Gakuin
1960 - Kansai
1961 - Doshisha
1965 - Ritsumeikan
1966 - Kinki
1970 - Kansai
1975 - OUC
1976 - OUC
1981 - Kinki
1983 - Kinki
1991 - Kansai
1992 - Ritsumeikan
1994 - Kinki
2005 - Kinki

Meiji Shrine Championships

Champion
1972 - Kansai
1978 - Doshisha
1989 - Doshisha
1990 - Kinki
1997 - Kinki

Runner-up
1983 - Kinki
1991 - Kansai
1992 - Ritsumeikan
1994 - Kinki
2005 - Kinki

League Champions
Numbers in parentheses refer to the Fall season games.

Kinki - 14 (18)
Ritsumei - 8 (4)
Kansai - 2 (0)
Doshisha - 1 (4)
Kwansei Gakuin - 1 (0)
Kyoto - 0 (0)

See also
Tokyo Big6 Baseball League

References

External links
Kansai Big6 Official Website (in Japanese)

Baseball leagues in Japan
Sports leagues established in 1931
1931 establishments in Japan
College baseball